Kowloon Reservoir, part of the Kowloon Group of Reservoirs, is a reservoir in Sha Tin District, Hong Kong, located within the Kam Shan Country Park. The total water storage capacity is 353 million gallons and the total cost of construction was $619,000.

History
In 1898, the British took over the New Territories and New Kowloon and the Public Works Department immediately sent engineering teams to explore water sources. However, the team found suitable valleys to build reservoirs in the west of Beacon Hill and south of Needle Hill. Construction for Kowloon Reservoir commenced in 1901 and it was completed in 1910, making it the first reservoir in the New Territories.

See also
List of reservoirs of Hong Kong
Kowloon Group of Reservoirs
Kowloon Reception Reservoir
Shek Lei Pui Reservoir

References

External links

Reservoirs of Hong Kong (1) Hong Kong and Kowloon (in Chinese)
Water Supplies Department. Fun of Fishing in Hong Kong Reservoirs

Kowloon Group of Reservoirs
Buildings and structures completed in 1910